New York Angels is an organization of seed capital angel investors that provides equity capital for early stage companies, primarily in the field of technology and new media. It is based in New York City. Members typically invest between US$100,000 and US$1,500,000 in companies that have begun operations, but have not reached a stage for acquiring venture capital.

In 1997, NYNMA co-founders, including Brian Horey, Laura Sachar, Alain Bankier and Jason Wright, facilitated the creation of the program to match new entrepreneurs with experienced Angel Investors. Following the crash of the dot-com bubble, NYNMA was disbanded and, in 2003, some of its remaining active angel investors spun themselves off into a separate, not-for-profit group under the leadership of David S. Rose, a serial entrepreneur and investor.

Since 2003, New York Angels has invested over $120 million into more than 290 early stage companies, mainly in the New York area. Its 130 accredited investor members include Gideon Gartner (Gartner Group and GIGA), Esther Dyson (Release 1.0 and PC Forum), Alan Patricof (Apax Ventures and Greycroft Partners), Scott Kurnit (About.com), Roger Ehrenberg (IA Capital), Jeff Stewart (Mimeo.com), Jon Whelan (AfterNIC.com), Linda Holliday (Digitas Health) and other technology entrepreneurs. The group also accepts venture capital firms as members, among which are First Round Capital, SoftBank Ventures Korea (SBVK), RRE Ventures, and SAVP/Greenhill.

New York Angels was the inaugural member of the professional trade group of American angel investor organizations, Angel Capital Association.

Leadership
Founder Rose and former chairman Brian Cohen each serve as New York Angels chairman emeritus, with Mark H. Schneider as chairman, and Elizabeth Lindsey as executive director.

References

External links
 New York Angels official web site
 New York Angels live statistics from Angelsoft.net
  Inc. magazine article about New York Angels
 BusinessWeek article on New York Angels

Financial services companies established in 2003
Venture capital firms of the United States